Velutina plicatilis is a species of small sea snail, a marine gastropod mollusk in the family Velutinidae.

Distribution
The distribution of Velutina plicatilis is circumboreal. The range of Velutina plicatilis include: 75°N to 45°N; 87°W to 0°W.

Distribution of Velutina plicatilis include:
 Greenland: West Greenland and East Greenland
 Canada: Devon Island, Newfoundland, Nova Scotia
 Irish Exclusive economic Zone
 North coast of Spain
 North Sea
 North West Atlantic
 West coast of Scotland

Velutina plicatilis is not common.

Description 
The maximum recorded shell length is 27 mm.

Habitat 
Minimum recorded depth is 10 m. Maximum recorded depth is 329 m.

References

External links

Velutinidae
Gastropods described in 1776
Taxa named by Otto Friedrich Müller